Alice Bartlett may refer to:
 Alice Elinor Bartlett (1848–1920), American author
 Alice Hunt Bartlett (1870–1949), British editor, poet, socialite and writer